Queenborough-in-Sheppey was a municipal borough in Kent, England from 1968 to 1974. It was created by a merger of the Municipal Borough of Queenborough with Sheerness Urban District and Sheppey Rural District, and occupied the entire Isle of Sheppey. It incorporated the following parishes:

Eastchurch
Elmley
Harty
Leysdown-on-Sea
Minster in Sheppey
Queenborough
Sheerness
Warden

In 1974 the council was abolished under the Local Government Act 1972, and the area now forms part of the Swale district.  Queenborough and various parishes in the island now have independent parish and town councils again.

Mayors
 1968-69 A.H.R. Copland
 1969-70 B.E.G. Bigg
 1970-71 B.E.G. Bigg
 1970-71 H.G. Harris
 1971-72 W.G. Baxter
 1972-73 R. D. Sharrock
 1973-74 R. D. Sharrock

Honorary Freemen of the Borough
 1971 Dr Matthew De Lacey OBE TD
 1973 Reginald James Davie JP

References

Districts of England abolished by the Local Government Act 1972
History of Kent
Municipal boroughs of England
Isle of Sheppey